Tony Louis Alexandre Aubin (8 December 1907 – 21 September 1981) was a French composer.

Career
Aubin was born in Paris. From 1925 to 1930, he studied at the Paris Conservatory under Samuel Rousseau (music theory), Noel Gallon (counterpoint), Philippe Gaubert (orchestration and composition), and Paul Dukas (composition). He was awarded the Prix de Rome for the cantata Actaeon in 1930.

He was artistic director at Paris-Mondial from 1937 to 1944, and professor at the Paris Conservatory from 1944 to 1977. He also conducted works for French radio between 1945 and 1960. His works, heavily indebted to the impressionism of Ravel and Dukas, include many film scores.

His pupils included Olivier Alain, Garbis Aprikian, Raynald Arseneault, Jocelyne Binet, Jacques Castérède, Pierre Cochereau, Marius Constant, Ginette Keller, Talivaldis Kenins, Yüksel Koptagel, Ron Nelson, Makoto Shinohara, and Williametta Spencer.

Works
Piano Sonata, 1930
Quatuor à cordes, 1930–1933
Prélude, Récitatif et Finale for piano, 1930–1933
Six Poèmes de Verlaine, 1932–1933
Cressida, Melodrama, 1934
1er Sinfonie, "Romantique", 1935–1937
Le Sommeil d'Iskender, 1936
Cantilène variée for cello and piano, 1937
La Chasse infernale (Le chevalier Pécopin), Scherzo Symphonique, 1941–1942
Jeanne d'Arc à Orléans, Oratorio, 1942
Suite danoise, 1942–1945
Athalie, 1943
Symphony No. 2, 1944 
François Villon, 1945 
Fourberies, Ballet, 1950–1952
Variations on a theme of Franz Schubert, Ballet, 1953
Grand pas on a theme of Johannes Brahms, Ballet, 1953
Suite éolienne for flute, clarinet, and orchestra, 1956
Périls, Lyrical drama, 1956–1958
La Source, 1960
Hymne à d'espérance, 1961
Concertinetto for violin and piano, 1964
Concertinetto del amicizia for flute and piano, 1965
Concertino della Brughiera for bassoon and piano, 1966–1975
Divertimento del incertezza for clarinet and piano or orchestra, 1967/ 1973
La Jeunesse de Goya, opera, 1968–1970
Concertino delle scoiattolo for oboe, piano and strings, 1970
Au fil de l'eau, 1970
Toccatrotta, 1972
Hidalgoyas for guitar, 1975
Passacaglia dell'addio for viola and piano, 1977

Filmography
 1941 : The Pavilion Burns (Jacques de Baroncelli)
 1942 : À l'assaut des Aiguilles du Diable (Marcel Ichac)
 1943 : Les Ailes blanches
 1943 : Le Corbeau (Henri-Georges Clouzot)
 1943 : Sondeurs d'abîmes (Marcel Ichac)
 1943 : Ceux du rivage
 1944 : La Collection Ménard
 The Pretty Miller Girl (1949)
 1952 : Groenland, 20 000 lieues sur les glaces (Marcel Ichac/Jean-Jacques Languepin)
 1952 : Victoire sur l'Annapurna (Marcel Ichac)
 1966 : Illusions perdues

References

Sources
Don Randel. The Harvard Biographical Dictionary of Music. Harvard, 1996, .

1907 births
1981 deaths
20th-century classical composers
20th-century French conductors (music)
20th-century French composers
20th-century French male musicians
Academic staff of the Conservatoire de Paris
Burials at Père Lachaise Cemetery
Conservatoire de Paris alumni
French classical composers
French male classical composers
French male conductors (music)
French film score composers
French male film score composers
Musicians from Paris
Prix de Rome for composition